In June 2010, Prime Minister Morgan Tsvangirai reshuffled the portion of the cabinet appointed by his party (MDC-T), within the  Government of National Unity that was formed on 13 February 2009. Ministers appointed by the other two parties were not reshuffled.

The Cabinet was again mildly reshuffled in July 2015.

Cabinet

*It is unknown who held these positions during that time.

Ministers of State

Deputy Ministers

The following have been nominated, but not yet sworn in:
 Deputy Minister of Agriculture - Roy Bennett (MDC-T)

See also
History of Zimbabwe

References

Coalition governments
Government of Zimbabwe
2010 establishments in Zimbabwe
Cabinets established in 2010